Galuzi (also Romanized as Galūzī; also known as Darakhshandeh, Derakhshandeh Galūzī, Galūzeyā, Galūzī Pāshā, Galūzyā, and Golūzīā) is a village in Direh Rural District, in the Central District of Gilan-e Gharb County, Kermanshah Province, Iran. At the 2006 census, its population was 354, in 75 families.

References 

Populated places in Gilan-e Gharb County